Huainan is a prefecture-level city with 3,033,528 inhabitants as of the 2020 census in north-central Anhui province, China. It is named for the Han-era Principality of Huainan. It borders the provincial capital of Hefei to the south, Lu'an to the southwest, Fuyang to the west, Bozhou to the northwest, Bengbu to the northeast and Chuzhou to the east. Huainan is one of the core cities of Hefei Metropolitan Circle and is known for its coal industry and thermal power plants. Its built-up area made of 4 urban districts (all but Panji not yet conurbated) and Fengtai County largely being urbanized, was home to 1,868,944 inhabitants as of 2020. Its city flower is the Chinese rose (Rosa chinensis) and its city tree is the Old-World Plane Tree (Platanus orientalis). It is also considered to be the hometown and birthplace of tofu.

Administration
The prefecture-level city of Huainan administers seven county-level divisions, including five districts and two counties.

Tianjia'an District
Panji District
Xiejiaji District
Datong District
Bagongshan District
Fengtai County
Shou County

These are further divided into 66 township-level divisions, including 24 towns, 23 townships and 19 subdistricts.

High-tech development zone
 Shannan New Area

Geography
The urban centre is located on a plain on the south bank of the Huai River, bordering Gaotang Lake on the east and forested hill area on the south. To the west are Bagongshan District and Shou County.

Climate

Economy

Huainan is a major production center for coal, with an output of 43.28 million tons in 2006.

The city hosted the 17th China Tofu Cultural Festival on September 15–17, 2010, including the National Bean Products Exhibition.

Education
Anhui University of Science and Technology official website
Huainan Normal University official website
Huainan United University official website
Huainan Vocational Technical College official website
Anhui Industry&Trade Vocational Technical College official website
Anhui Modern Information Engineering College official website
The key high schools:

 Huainan No.1 High School
 Huainan No.2 High School
 Huainan No.5 High School
 Huainan No.4 High School
 Fengtai No.1 High School
 Shouxian No.1 High School

Transportation
East of the city a bridge crosses the Huai River, shared by the Fuyang-Huainan Railway and highway S225. Near the city center, a ferry provides connection to the (rural) north bank of the Huai River.

Rail
 Huainan railway station, terminus of the Fuyang-Huainan Railway and Huainan Railway
 Huainan East railway station (high-speed services) on the Hefei–Bengbu high-speed railway
 Huainan South railway station (high-speed services) on the Shangqiu–Hangzhou high-speed railway

Highway
Expressways
  S17 Benghe Expressway
  S12 Chuxin Expressway
National Highways
  G206

See also
List of twin towns and sister cities in China
Yuan You

References

External links

Government website of Huainan 
http://www.ah.xinhuanet.com/huainan/index.htm 

 
Cities in Anhui